Reverse is the fourth album of the progressive metal band Eldritch, containing a cover of "My Sharona".

Track listing 
"E-Nest" (intro) - 1:10
"Reverse" - 5:07
"Slavery On Line" - 5:17
"Leftovers and Crumb" - 4:32
"Bittersweet Penny" - 4:28
"Bio-Trinity" - 5:51
"Suffering Degree" - 4:31
"My Sharona" (The Knack cover) - 3:10
"Soul Shrinkage" - 4:02
"Leech" - 4:30
"Little Irwin" - 6:10

Eldritch (band) albums
2001 albums